Esfand is the twelfth and final month of the Solar Hijri calendar, the official calendar of Iran and Afghanistan. Esfand has twenty-nine days normally, and thirty during leap years. It begins in February and ends in March of the Gregorian calendar. The Afghan Persian name is Hūt; in Pashto it is Kab.

Esfand is the third and last month of the winter season (Zemestan), and is followed by Farvardin.

Events 
 28 - 1292 - The first Stanley Cup Finals in hockey history concludes with the victory of the Toronto Hockey Club, champion team of the National Hockey Association (NHA) against the Victoria Aristocrats, champions of the Pacific Coast Hockey Association (PCHA).
 26 - 1316 - Anschluss of Austria into Germany
 13 - 1328 - The 1951 Asian Games Opening Ceremony is held in New Delhi, India, the first in Asian Games history.
 3 - 1366 - Askeran riots in the USSR - beginning of the Nagorno-Karabakh conflict
 29 - 1373 - Tokyo subway sarin attack
 20 - 1389 - Japanese earthquake - Fukushima disaster
 5 - 1400 - 2022 Russian invasion of Ukraine begins

Observances 
 5 Esfand: Sepandārmazgān
 5-6 Esfand: Defender of the Fatherland Day and National Day of Brunei
 6-7 Esfand: Independence Day (Estonia)
 12-13 Esfand: Liberation Day (Bulgaria) 
 15 Esfand: Arbor Day in Iran This date, which typically starts on March 5, starts Natural Recyclable Resources Week, ending on March 12.
 17-18 Esfand: International Women's Day 
 26-27 Esfand: St. Patrick's Day
 28-29 Esfand: Saint Joseph's Day
 Last Tuesday of Esfand: Chaharshanbe Suri

Movable observances and festivals 
 Lantern Festival: Held 15 days following the Chinese New Year, date falls on first or second week of this month
 Frawardigan: Held 19-29 Esfand in normal years, and 20-30 Esfand in leap years, Zoroastrian period of remembrance of the dead

Births

Deaths 

 16 - 1391 - Hugo Chávez, was the President of Venezuela from 1999 until his death in 2013
 17 - 1308 - William Howard Taft, Chief Justice and 27th President of the United States
 18 - 1390 - Simin Daneshvar, Iranian was an Iranian[4] academic, novelist, fiction writer and translator.

References 

Months of the Iranian calendar